Kelleria is a genus of miniature shrubs in the family Thymelaeaceae, found in Australia, New Zealand and Papua New Guinea. The centre of species biodiversity is the Lammermoor Range in Central Otago, NZ.

Species
Species accepted by the Plants of the World Online as of February 2023: 

Kelleria bogongensis 
Kelleria childii 
Kelleria croizatii 
Kelleria dieffenbachii 
Kelleria ericoides 
Kelleria laxa 
Kelleria lyallii 
Kelleria multiflora 
Kelleria paludosa 
Kelleria tessellata 
Kelleria villosa

References

Thymelaeoideae
Malvales genera